Helga Németh (born 7 August 1973 in Nagykanizsa) was during her active career a Hungarian handball player who has won the bronze medal with the Hungarian team on the 1996 Summer Olympics. She played all five matches and scored 18 goals.

Helga Németh has been rewarded as one of the best women handball players of all times.

After her active career as a handball player, Helga Németh started her career as a handball coach and built up her own charity to support children in need.

Awards and recognition

During her active career as a handball player she won numerous tournaments and received honorable awards.

Personal achievements

  144 times selected for the Hungarian National Team
  1994: European Selection All Star Team Member
  1994: Selected All-Star Right Back of the European Championship
  1995: World Selection Member
  1997: Selected second best Handball Player of the World (Anja Andersen (DK) voted best player due to the Danish Team won the World Championship in Germany that year)
  2008: European Selection Player

Hungarian National Team

  1993: World Championship 7th place
  1994: European Championship 4th place
  1995: World Championship 2nd place
  1996: Bronze Medal at the Olympic Games in Atlanta, U.S.A.
  1997: World Championship 9th place
  1998: European Championship 3rd place
  2002: European Championship 5th place

European Cup Winner

  1994: BEK Hypobank (Austria)
  1995: KEK Dunaferr (Hungary)
  2004: EHF Viborg (Denmark)
  2006: EHF FTC Ferencváros Torna Club (Hungary)

National League Champion and Cup Winner

  1994: Austrian National League Champion and Cup Winner with Hypobank Team (Vienna)
  1997: Croatian National League Champion and Cup Winner with Podravka Team (Koprivnica)
  2004: Danish National League Champion and Cup Winner with Viborg Team (Viborg)
  2007: Hungarian National League Champion with FTC Ferencváros Torna Club (Budapest)

Club history

  1983-1989: Oil Miners Handball Club Nagykanizsa (Hungary) under the coach László Uzsoki
  1989-1991: BHG Budapest (Hungary)
  1991-1993: TFSE Budapest (Hungary)
  1993-1994: Hypobank Handball Club Vienna (Austria)
  1994-1997: Dunaferr SE Dunaujváros (Hungary)
  1997-1998: Podravka SC Koprivnica (Croatia)
  1998-2003: Cornexi-Alcoa Székesvehérvár (Hungary)
  2003-2004: VHK Viborg (Denmark)
  2004-2005: Dunaferr SE Dunaujváros (Hungary)
  2005-2008: FTC Ferencváros Torna Club Budapest (Hungary)
  2008-2013: VSE Érd (Hungary) as player and coach

References 

Hungarian female handball players
Olympic handball players of Hungary
Handball players at the 1996 Summer Olympics
Olympic bronze medalists for Hungary
People from Nagykanizsa
1973 births
Living people
Olympic medalists in handball
Medalists at the 1996 Summer Olympics
RK Podravka Koprivnica players
Sportspeople from Zala County